The 2022 Akron Zips football team represent the University of Akron as a member of the East Division of the Mid-American Conference (MAC) during the 2022 NCAA Division I FBS football season. Led by first-year head coach Joe Moorhead, the Zips play home games at InfoCision Stadium in Akron, Ohio.

Schedule

Roster

References

Akron
Akron Zips football seasons
Akron Zips football